is a Japanese female idol group. The group was formerly named .

History

2004 to 2011
In 2004, Hello! Project held a nationwide audition titled "Hello Pro Egg Audition 2004". Out of over 10,000 applicants, 31 girls were successful. Six out of the seven members were originally part of the "egg" generation, while Sato Ayano joined the trainee group in 2009. During the last egg concert of 2010, Hello! Project announced a change in their trainee group. As part of this change, many older members completed their training, but were not added to the major groups within Hello! Project. Saho Akari was the last to complete her training. Up Up Girls originally consisted of six girls, later growing to seven with the addition of Saho Akari. Their first event was held on May 1, 2011.

2012 to 2015
From their formation to late 2012 all of their releases were under Up-Front Works, after which they were signed by T-Palette Records. Their first seven singles and first album were released by Up-Front Works. They were transferred to Up-Front Create. The group is currently jointly managed by YU-M Entertainment and Up-Front Group. During 2015, Up-Front Group created a partnership with YU-M, a new agency. YU-M is their primary management while Up-Front Create is a producer of their releases.

2016 to 2017 
Under YU-M, the group reached their dream of performing at Nippon Budokan. The company was able to afford the rental cost, but "ran out" of money for outfits and decorations. This resulted in the crowdfunding of over 12,000,000 JYP. The crowdfunding was successful, but they did not reach their goal of selling out the venue and only filled a little over 4000 of Budokan's 14,000+ capacity.

At this Budokan concert, they announced their search for girls who would become either a sister group, rival group, or full members. The auditions began on November 8, 2016. In February the four successful applicants from the audition were announced. With a late addition to the group, these five girls formed Up Up Girls (2), pronounced Kakko Niki. They are a sister group to Up Up Girls (Kakko Kari). From May 29 to June 19, 2017, auditions for Up Up Girls (Pro-Wrestler) were held. From these auditions, four successful applicants formed the newest addition to the Up Up Girls lineup.

2017 
On April 28, Sengoku Minami and Sato Ayano announced their graduation from Up Up Girls (Kari). Sengoku moved on to acting while Sato retired from the entertainment industry. After the graduation of Sengoku Minami and Sato Ayano on September 15, 2017, the group decreased to five members. No additional members were added to their lineup and no announcements were made as to whether or not Kakko Niki or Pro-Wrestler members would join the flagship group. After a short break, Up Up Girls (Kari) returned to the stage in November 2017 as a five-member group.

2020 
On September 26, the group held the "Up Up Girls (Kakko Kari) ENDLESS SUMMER in HIBIYA YAON" live concert, which was streamed through the Japanese website Niconico. The crowdfunding for the concert had opened on September 1, with 100% of the 8 million yen target amount being raised within just over three weeks. They raised over 12 million yen total for the concert. During the concert, it was announced that the group would go through a 'major system change', with new member auditions starting.

On October 26, members Konatsu Furukawa, Saki Mori, Akari Saho and Manami Arai all announced their graduations from the group, which would leave Azusa Sekine as the only remaining original member. The group would hold a final event with their five member lineup called "Up Up Girls (Kakko Kari) FIVE SOUL FOREVER" on December 17 at Zepp Tokyo, with an additional farewell party. It was also added that Mori Saki would be the only member retiring from the entertainment industry.

On November 10, they released their final album as five titled "6th Album (Kakko Kari)".

On December 17, they held the aforementioned Up Up Girls (Kakko Kari) FIVE SOUL FOREVER concert, marking it as Furukawa, Mori, Saho and Arai's final live concert with the group. At the concert, it was revealed that seven members had passed the audition. These members were Yurika Furuya, Meina Suzuki, Sumire Kudo, Ayu Suzuki, Seina Koyama, Yume Aoyagi and Haruka Sumida. Along with these new members, Sekine announced that she would change her member color from orange to red.

On December 31, Furukawa, Mori, Saho and Arai officially ended activities and graduated from the group.

2021 
 
On July 27, they released new single titled "Ippome no YES! / Sensen Brand New World!"

2022 
On January 25, they released first mini album titled "Apuga Yabai "

Members

Current

Former

Timeline

Discography

Singles

Albums

DVDs

References

External links 
  (Japanese)

Japanese girl groups
Japanese idol groups
Japanese pop music groups
Musical groups established in 2011
2011 establishments in Japan
Musical groups from Tokyo
Up-Front Group